Jorge Antonio Muñoz Abarca (born 30 July 1981) is a Chilean former footballer who played as a midfielder.

Career
He played for Chilean clubs Palestino (2000–05), Barnechea (2002), Santiago Wanderers (2005–06), and Santiago Morning (2007 and 2009), with an intervening spell in the Malaysian Super League with Perak FA (2007–08).

On 9 November 2007, Malaysian media reported that Perak FA had secured Muñoz' services along with his fellow countryman, Mario Berrios.

References

External links
 
 
 
 Jorge Muñoz at MemoriaWanderers 
 Jorge Muñoz at playmakerstats.com (English version of ceroacero.es)

1981 births
Living people
Footballers from Santiago
Chilean footballers
Chilean expatriate footballers
Club Deportivo Palestino footballers
A.C. Barnechea footballers
Santiago Wanderers footballers
Santiago Morning footballers
Perak F.C. players
Chilean Primera División players
Tercera División de Chile players
Primera B de Chile players
Malaysia Super League players
Expatriate footballers in Malaysia
Chilean expatriate sportspeople in Malaysia
Association football midfielders
Chilean football managers